Alexander Pope (176322 March 1835) was an Irish actor and painter.

Life
He was born in Cork, Ireland.
He was educated to follow his father's profession of miniature painting. He continued to paint miniatures and exhibit them at the Royal Academy as late as 1821; but at an early date he took the stage, first appearing in London as Oroonoko in 1785 at Covent Garden. 
He remained at this theatre almost continuously for nearly twenty years, then at the Haymarket until his retirement, playing leading parts, chiefly tragic. He was well known as Othello and Henry VIII.

He played for the first time in Edinburgh on 15 June 1786, as Othello.

Family
He was married three times. 
His first wife, Elizabeth (1744–1797), a favourite English actress of great versatility, was billed before her marriage as Miss Younge. His second wife, Maria Ann Campion (1775–1803), also a popular actress, was a member of an Irish family. His third wife, born Clara Maria Leigh (1768–1838), was the widow of the artist Francis Wheatley, and herself a skilful painter of figures and of flowers, under the name of Mrs Pope.

Selected roles
Frederick in The School for Widows by Richard Cumberland (1789)
 Sir Alexander Seaton in The Siege of Berwick by Edward Jerningham (1793)
 Asgill in The Town Before You by Hannah Cowley (1794)
 Mr Mordent in The Deserted Daughter by Thomas Holcroft (1795)
 Captain Faulkener in The Way to Get Married by Thomas Morton (1796)
 Charles Stanley in A Cure for the Heart Ache by Thomas Morton (1797)
 Mr Deleval in He's Much to Blame by Thomas Holcroft (1798)
 Sir Philip Blandford in Speed the Plough by Thomas Morton (1798)
 Greville in Secrets Worth Knowing by Thomas Morton (1798)
 Frederick Fervid in Five Thousand a Year by Thomas Dibdin (1799)
 Leonard Vizorly in The Votary of Wealth by Joseph George Holman (1799)
 Captain Sentamour in The Sailor's Daughter by Richard Cumberland (1804)
 Marquis Valdez in Remorse by Samuel Taylor Coleridge (1813)
 St. Aldobrand in Bertram by Charles Maturin (1816)
Drusus in Caius Gracchus by James Sheridan Knowles (1823)
 Clotaire in Ben Nazir by Thomas Colley Grattan (1827)

References

External links
Neil Jeffares Dictionary of pastellists before 1800

1763 births
1835 deaths
Irish male stage actors
People from County Cork
18th-century Irish painters
19th-century Irish painters
Irish male painters
18th-century Irish male actors
19th-century Irish male actors
19th-century British male actors
Irish emigrants to Great Britain
19th-century Irish male artists